Papuli may refer to:

Agron Papuli (born 1955), Albanian businessman
Papoli (disambiguation), villages in Iran